Nomonhan is a small village in Inner Mongolia, China, south of the city of Manzhouli and near the China–Mongolia border.

In the summer of 1939, it was the location of the Nomonhan Incident, as it is known in Japan, or the Battle of Khalkhin Gol, as it is known in Russia and Mongolia.

References

 
 
 

Manchuria